S.O.S. Conspiración Bikini (English: "S.O.S. Bikini Conspiracy") is a 1967 Mexican action adventure spy film written and directed by René Cardona Jr. and starring Julio Alemán, Sonia Furió and Sonia Infante. It is the first film in a duology centered on the character of Alex Dinamo, the "Mexican James Bond", followed by Peligro... Mujeres en acción (1969).

Plot
The Secret Organizational Service (S.O.S.) is an international crime syndicate that has been successful with their all-female agents operating under the guise of a fashion model agency led by Madame Bristol (Sonia Infante). Meanwhile, the International Service is the governmental secret service dedicated to put an end to SOS's actions. An agent has infiltrated SOS, but she is in danger after sending a coded message to her supervising inspector. As a result, the International Service sends their top agent, Alex Dinamo (Julio Alemán), alongside agent Adriana (Sonia Furió), to give the undercover agent a hand.

Cast
Julio Alemán as Alex Dinamo
Sonia Furió as Adriana
Sonia Infante as Madame Bristol
Roberto Cañedo as Chief of the International Service
Maura Monti as Lucrecia
Noé Murayama as Uli, Bristol's assistant 
Grace Polit as SOS Undercover Agent
Carlos Agostí as Luigi, Bristol's assistant
Isela Vega as SOS Stage Director
Lorraine Chanel as Madame Rapière
Liza Castro as Bristol's assistant
Juan Garza
Lucho Gálvez
Jorge Fegan

Production and release
The film was shot in Ecuador, one of several Mexican film productions that were filmed in the country in the 1960s.

The film was released in Mexico on 3 August 1967, on the Roble and Carrusel cinemas, for two weeks.

Reception
Héctor Trejo Sánchez Pinceladas de cine mexicano. La cultura popular mexicana retratada por el séptimo arte wrote positively about S.O.S. Conspiración Bikini and Peligro... Mujeres en acción, in particular about the latter, saying that Alex Dinamo was the most relevant character of the Mexican spy cinema, and that it was successful in giving James Bond "a Latin face" and "a Latin American spirit." In Breve historia del cine mexicano: primer siglo, 1897–1997, Emilio García Riera was less enthusiastic, however, when citing the film as an example, alongside El asesino se embarca (1967) and Cuatro contra el crimen (1968), of Mexican films made in the 1960s to cash in on the success of the James Bond films, referring to them as examples of "underdeveloped James Bond-ism."

References

External links

1967 films
1960s Spanish-language films
1960s action adventure films
1960s spy films
Films directed by René Cardona Jr.
Mexican action adventure films
1960s Mexican films